The Turkish Airlines Open is a European Tour golf tournament played annually in Turkey since 2013. In both 2013 and 2014 the tournament was the penultimate event of the European Tour Final Series.

The first three tournaments were held at the Montgomerie Maxx Royal. In October 2015, it was announced that Turkish Airlines would continue as headline sponsor the tournament for a further three years and it will move to Regnum Carya Golf Club from 2016.

Victor Dubuisson won the first event in 2013 by two shots from Jamie Donaldson.

In 2013 qualification was open to the top 50 in the Official World Golf Ranking three weeks before the event, five tournament invitations, three Turkish players, with the remainder from the 2013 Race to Dubai to make up a field of 78. Following the Turkish Airlines Open the leading 60 players in the Race to Dubai qualified for the season-ending DP World Tour Championship, Dubai, provided they had participated in two of the first three tournaments of the Final Series and played in enough 2013 European Tour events.

In 2014 qualification was open to the top 60 in the Official World Golf Ranking three weeks before the event, four tournament invitations, three Turkish players invited by the Turkish Golf Federation, with the remainder from the 2014 Race to Dubai to make up a field of 78. Following the Turkish Airlines Open the leading 60 players in the Race to Dubai will qualify for the season-ending DP World Tour Championship, Dubai.  In 2016, qualification criteria were revised.  The field consists of the top 70 available players from the Race to Dubai, three Turkish players, and five unrestricted tournament invitations.  Alternates are drawn from the Race to Dubai standings beyond the top 70 available.

In 2015, the tournament was brought forward to the start of the Final Series due to the 2015 G-20 Antalya summit. Jaco van Zyl carded an opening round of 61 that would have broken the course record if preferred lies had not been in operation. The South African shared the lead with Victor Dubuisson going into the final round but the Frenchman birdied three of his last four holes on the way to a 66 that secured him his second win in Turkey and his second ever victory on the European Tour.

Winners

See also
World Golf Final
Turkish Airlines World Golf Cup

References

External links

Coverage on the European Tour's official site

Former European Tour events
Golf tournaments in Turkey
Recurring sporting events established in 2013
2013 establishments in Turkey